Dauphin was a Quarter on the Caribbean island nation of Saint Lucia. The district was merged with Gros-Islet in 2014. It was home to Amerindians, the Island Caribs, who settled there. To this day, there are ruins which serve as a reminder of people who lived there long before Christopher Columbus crossed the Atlantic from Europe.

History
Dauphin Quarter is a historical term created during the French colonization of Saint Lucia.  It was given to the district and town by the French governor to honor the heir to the French throne, Dauphin of France.

See also
Quarters of Saint Lucia

References

Quarters of Saint Lucia
Subdivisions of Saint Lucia